The AL postcode area, also known as the St Albans postcode area, is a group of ten postcode districts in England, within five post towns. These cover central Hertfordshire, including St Albans, Harpenden, Welwyn, Welwyn Garden City and Hatfield.

Mail for this area is processed at the Home Counties North Mail Centre in Hemel Hempstead, and is delivered from offices at St Albans (Brick Knoll Park AL1), Harpenden (Station Road AL5), and Hatfield (Town Centre AL10). The area covered includes most of the St Albans and Welwyn Hatfield districts, plus the northeastern part of the Dacorum district and very small parts of the Hertsmere, North Hertfordshire and East Hertfordshire districts.



Coverage
The approximate coverage of the postcode districts:

 
|-
! AL1
| ST ALBANS
| St Albans
| St Albans
|-
! AL2
| ST ALBANS
| St Albans, Bricket Wood, Colney Street, Frogmore, London Colney, Napsbury, Park Street, Potters Crouch, Chiswell Green 
| St Albans, Hertsmere
|-
! AL3
| ST ALBANS
| St Albans, Childwickbury, Flamstead, Gorhambury, Markyate, New Greens, Porters Wood, Redbourn, Sandridge
| St Albans, Dacorum
|-
! AL4
| ST ALBANS
| St Albans, Blackmore End, Colney Heath, London Colney, Jersey Farm, Marshalswick, Oaklands, Sandridge, Smallford, Tyttenhanger, Wheathampstead
| St Albans, Hertsmere, North Hertfordshire
|-
! AL5
| HARPENDEN
| Harpenden, Kinsbourne Green
| St Albans
|-
! AL6
| WELWYN
| Welwyn, Ayot St Peter, Ayot St Lawrence, Digswell, Rabley Heath, Tewin
| Welwyn Hatfield, East Hertfordshire, North Hertfordshire
|-
! AL7
| WELWYN GARDEN CITY
| Welwyn Garden City (east)
| Welwyn Hatfield
|-
! AL8
| WELWYN GARDEN CITY

| Welwyn Garden City (west), Lemsford
| Welwyn Hatfield
|-
! AL9
| HATFIELD
| Hatfield (Old Hatfield), Brookmans Park, Essendon, North Mymms, Welham Green
| Welwyn Hatfield
|-
! AL10
| HATFIELD
| Hatfield (new town)
| Welwyn Hatfield 
|}

Map

See also
List of postcode areas in the United Kingdom
Postcode Address File

References

External links
Royal Mail's Postcode Address File
A quick introduction to Royal Mail's Postcode Address File (PAF)

St Albans
Postcode areas covering the East of England
Welwyn Hatfield